X-Plane is a flight simulation engine series developed and published by Laminar Research in 1995. X-Plane is the only flight simulator suitable for both Windows and macOS with commercial desktop versions available sold for macOS, Windows, and Linux. In addition, Laminar Research also distributes FAA-certified versions for professional use.  A mobile version is available for Android, iOS, and webOS since 2009 as well.

X-Plane is pre-packaged with several commercial and military aircraft, as well as global scenery, which covers most of the Earth. X-Plane also has a plugin architecture that allows users to create their own modules, extending the functionality of the software by letting users create their own worlds or replicas of places on Earth. This is further enhanced by the X-Plane forums, where users can share aircraft, scenery, plugins, and the Scenery Gateway website, which allows users to share airports with other users, which can be eventually integrated into the base product.

On November 25, 2016, Laminar Research released the public beta of the simulator's latest version, X-Plane 11, to the general public. A second public beta was released on December 6, 2016, which fixed some major bugs. The official release of X-Plane 11 was on March 30, 2017. Update 11.50 in September 2020 introduced Vulkan and Metal support.

On December 9, 2019, X-Plane Mobile Global, a major update for the mobile port, was released. Although initially available for free, only five initial locations are available without purchase of a monthly subscription.

On September 25, 2021, X-Plane 12 was announced at Flight Sim Expo 2021. It was released as an early access version on September 6, 2022. Along with flight model, automatic terrain generation (autogen), and water improvements, it features a new weather engine featuring volumetric clouds and windscreen rain effects. New aircraft such as the Airbus A330, Cessna Citation X, F-14, PA-18 SuperCub with tundra tires and Cirrus SR22 are included.

Flight model

X-Plane differentiates itself from other simulators by implementing an aerodynamic model called blade element theory. Traditionally, flight simulators emulate the real-world performance of an aircraft by using empirical data in predefined lookup tables to determine aerodynamic forces such as lift or drag, which vary with differing flight conditions. These simulators sufficiently simulate the flight characteristics of the aircraft, specifically those with known aerodynamic data, but are not useful in design work, and do not predict the performance of aircraft when the actual figures are not available.

Blade element theory improves on this type of simulation, by modeling the forces and moments on an aircraft and individually evaluating the parts that constitute it. Blade-element theory and other computational aerodynamic models are often used to compute aerodynamic forces in real-time or pre-compute aerodynamic forces of a new design for use in a simulator employing lookup tables.

With blade element theory, a surface (e.g. wing) may be made up of many sections (1 to 4 is typical), and each section is further divided into as many as 10 separate subsections.  After that, the lift and drag of each section are calculated, and the resulting effect is applied to the whole aircraft. When this process is applied to each component, the simulated aircraft will fly similarly to its real-life counterpart. This approach allows users to design aircraft quickly and easily, as the simulator engine immediately illustrates how an aircraft with a given design might perform in the real world. X-Plane can model fairly complex aircraft designs, including helicopters, rockets, rotorcraft, and tilt-rotor craft.

Extensibility

Users are encouraged to design their own aircraft, and design software titled Plane Maker and Airfoil Maker are included with the program. This has created an active community of users who use the simulator for a variety of purposes. Since designing an aircraft is relatively simple and the flight model can help predict performance of real-world aircraft, several aircraft companies use X-Plane in their design process. The CarterCopter uses X-Plane for flight training and research. X-Plane also contributed to the design of the Atlantica blended wing body aircraft.

Through the plugin interface, users can create external modules that extend the X-Plane interface or flight model or create new features. The xPilot and Swift plugins allow X-Plane users to fly on a worldwide shared air traffic control network, VATSIM. Other work has been done in the area of improving X-Plane's flight model and even replacing entire facets of X-Plane's operation.

Maps and scenery are fully editable. While no tool is provided to edit the 3D mesh objects, there are tutorials for using the third-party 3D modelers AC3D, SketchUp, Blender, and Autodesk 3ds Max

Network flight
X-Plane can connect to other X-Plane instances via UDP or TCP for multiplayer flight simulation, networked multi-monitor X-Plane configurations or to plugins, such as Pilot Edge, which themselves communicate with other X-Plane instances.

The X-Plane IOS (Instructor Operation Station) can be used remotely (via the Internet) or locally (via a computer connected to the X-Plane session by a LAN) as part of a flight training session allowing a flight instructor to alter and control the aircraft in various ways. It can be used to simulate various aircraft system failures and also to change the weather, time, or location.

X-Plane is a popular simulator used to connect to the IVAO or VATSIM network. For VATSIM there are two clients are used to do so, Swift and xPilot. XSquawkBox was originally developed several years ago but is now deprecated due to VATSIM's new Velocity update, increasing flight position update speed, and xPilot was created as a modern client, built with a X-Plane 11-style UI.

It can also use an IOS station on another computer via LAN

Utilities
Multiple utilities are shipped with X-Plane 10/11/12 by Laminar Research for users to customize various aspects of the simulation including World Editor and Plane Maker.

World Editor is an overlay editor with a graphic user interface to facilitate editing of airports. With the most recent update, this utility uses global resources to allow users to submit data to be included in X-Plane by default with each update. The primary purpose, of this tool, is to modify and correct airport layouts. World Editor also can read the geographical coordinates in GeoTIFF files. In version 1.3r1, a new feature was added to allow users to submit airports using default assets to an Airport Scenery Gateway.

Plane Maker is a program that lets users create and edit their own aircraft for use with X-Plane. Users can create aircraft that exist in real life or only in their imagination and see how they would fly in the real world. It is also possible to update existing aircraft to make them more like the real thing.

Commercial and professional use

The professional use version of X-Plane adds more features compared to the personal use version depending on the license. A commercial license allows one to use X-Plane without being tied to a specific computer via e.g. a disk or USB key. The commercial version also supports "kiosk mode", locking X-Plane's settings via password protection. The professional use version can also allow one to generate revenue from X-Plane related content.

The professional use version allows FAA certified flight training hours to be logged, but the computer system running X-Plane must be tested to meet minimum frame-rate requirements and have its hardware and all associated simulation hardware tested to be FAA certified. Furthermore, FAA certification may require expensive simulation hardware (e.g. professional flight simulation hardware).

The professional use version enables more advanced flight simulation hardware compared to the personal use version. For example, it is capable of cylindrical and spherical projection, which is commonly used in large and/or expensive professional flight simulators. The professional use version also has the ability to drive Garmin Real Simulator Units.

Versions 
The following table summarizes the release history for the X-Plane.

See also

 FlightGear Flight Simulator
 Microsoft Flight Simulator (Flight Simulator 2020)
 Lockheed Martin Prepar3D
 Digital Combat Simulator
 GeoFS
 FlightSimCon

References

External links

 
 
 

1995 video games
Android (operating system) games
Flight simulation video games
General flight simulators
IOS games
Linux games
Classic Mac OS games
MacOS games
Video games developed in the United States
Windows games